Concert music may refer to 
Brass band, music performed by brass ensembles
Classical music, the art music produced in, or rooted in, the traditions of Western liturgical and secular music, encompassing a broad period from roughly the 9th century to present times
Orchestral music, as distinct from chamber music
Concert band, music performed by wind ensembles
Light music, 20th Century light orchestral music

See also
Konzertmusik for Brass and String Orchestra, a composition by Paul Hindemith